Chen Jie (born 8 July 1965) is a Chinese engineer who is a professor and the current president of Tongji University, and an academician of the Chinese Academy of Engineering.

Biography
Chen was born in Fuqing, Fujian, on 8 July 1965. He attended the Fuqing Experimental Primary School. He secondary studied at Fuqing No. 1 High School. He earned a bachelor's degree in 1986, a master's degree in 1996, and a doctor's degree in 2001, all from Beijing Institute of Technology.

He was a visiting scholar at California State University between 1989 and 1990, a visiting research fellow at Tokyo Institute of Technology in 1993, and research fellow at the University of Birmingham from 1996 to 1997. In April 2014, he became vice president of Tongji University, rising to president in July 2018.

Honours and awards 
 Senior Member of the Institute of Electrical and Electronics Engineers (IEEE)
 27 November 2017 Member of the Chinese Academy of Engineering (CAE)

References 

1965 births
Living people
People from Fuqing
Engineers from Fujian
Beijing Institute of Technology alumni
Academic staff of Tongji University
Presidents of Tongji University
Members of the Chinese Academy of Engineering